Melvin Brown (March 5, 1932 – September 13, 2018) was an American football coach and former player. He played college football at the University of Oklahoma under head coach Bud Wilkinson.  Brown was the head football coach at Southeastern State College—now known as Southeastern Oklahoma State University—from 1957 to 1961 and Sam Houston State University from 1978 to 1981.

Head coaching record

References

1932 births
2018 deaths
Houston Cougars football coaches
Oklahoma Sooners football players
Sam Houston Bearkats football coaches
Southeastern Oklahoma State Savage Storm football coaches
People from Denison, Texas
Coaches of American football from Texas
Players of American football from Texas